SEVEN is an Indian lifestyle brand that manufactures and markets casual and sportswear clothing and footwear. The brand was launched in February 2016 by Indian cricketer and former captain of the Indian national cricket team, Mahendra Singh Dhoni and RS Seven Lifestyle. Dhoni is the brand ambassador of SEVEN and also owns footwear side of the business.

Background
SEVEN was launched by RS Seven Lifestyle (owned by Rhiti Group) and MS Dhoni on 19 February 2016 in New Delhi. Dhoni was announced as the global brand ambassador. The brand was launched as a lifestyle brand, with plans to manufacture and market sportswear; both clothing and footwear. Clothing and fashion accessory side of the brand is owned by RS Seven Lifestyle whereas footwear side of the brand is owned by MS Dhoni. Manufacturing for the brand is done in India, China and Vietnam.

Brand name
The brand name SEVEN coincides with the ODI and T20 shirt number of MS Dhoni.
SEVEN is the official kit sponsor of Chennai Super Kings in IPL and Joburg Super Kings in SA20

Sponsorship
It previously has sponsored I-League 2nd Division side ARA FC, based in Ahmedabad.

Distribution and stores
SEVEN has fifteen distributors in India. It also has distributors in the United States and in the Middle East. Flipkart is the official e-commerce partner of the brand. The brand is available at more than 300 multi-brand retail stores in India. On 20 July 2017, the first outlet of SEVEN was launched in Dhoni's hometown Ranchi.

See also

References

External links
 Official website

Clothing companies of India
Indian brands
Sportswear brands